Haviland-Davison Grist Mill is a historic grist mill located at East Rockaway in Nassau County, New York. It was restored and relocated to its present site in Memorial Park in 1963.  It was built about 1689 and is a -story, "T" shaped, timber-frame building.  The original section has one large addition and two smaller wings attached to each side.

It was listed on the National Register of Historic Places in 1998.

The mill is now known as the East Rockaway Grist Mill Museum and features artifacts and displays of local history.

References

External links

 Grist Mill Museum Committee - Village of East Rockaway

Grinding mills on the National Register of Historic Places in New York (state)
Industrial buildings completed in 1689
Museums in Nassau County, New York
History museums in New York (state)
Grinding mills in New York (state)
Mill museums in New York (state)
National Register of Historic Places in Nassau County, New York
1689 establishments in the Province of New York